Nathan Miller (born July 18, 1988 in Little Rock, Arkansas) is an American pair skater. He teamed up with Britney Simpson in April 2008. Together, they are the 2010 U.S. junior silver medalists and placed 6th at the 2009–2010 ISU Junior Grand Prix Final. Their partnership ended in 2011.

Competitive highlights

Pair skating with Simpson

Pair skating with Davis

Ice dancing with Kim

References

External links

 
 

American male pair skaters
1988 births
Living people
Sportspeople from Little Rock, Arkansas
21st-century American people